Michael Clarkson Ryan (April 23, 1820 – October 23, 1861) was an American attorney and one of eight founders of Beta Theta Pi, a college fraternity founded at Miami University in 1839.  He was born in Lancaster, Pennsylvania and his family moved to Hamilton, Ohio in 1832. He received his A.B. degree from Miami in 1839 and his LL.B. from Cincinnati in 1842. He began to practice law in Hamilton, Ohio with his brother-in-law John B. Weller, a future U.S. Congressman, Senator and California governor. Ryan was prosecuting attorney of Butler County, Ohio (1848–62) and clerk of courts (1852–58).  He was appointed by Ohio Governor William Dennison a Colonel in the 50th Ohio Infantry in the Civil War but he died in October 1861 before he was able to serve.

See also
List of Beta Theta Pi members

Sources
Brown, James T., ed., Catalogue of Beta Theta Pi, New York: 1917.

External links

1861 deaths
Miami University alumni
Beta Theta Pi founders
1820 births
Union Army colonels